Rachel Smalley is a New Zealand television and radio journalist and presenter. From 2013 to 2017 she hosted Early Edition every weekday morning on Newstalk ZB and wrote regular columns for The New Zealand Herald.

Early life
Smalley grew up in rural Canterbury and received her secondary education from Lincoln High School, where she graduated in 1987 (sixth form).

Career
After graduating from Wellington Polytechnic, Smalley began her career in radio journalism with Newstalk ZB before moving to TV3. Smalley moved to the UK and worked for Sky News. She later became the MediaWorks Europe correspondent for a time before returning to New Zealand to host TV3's Nightline. In 2011 Smalley began fronting the station's breakfast programme Firstline. She also hosted weekly politics and current affairs programme The Nation. In 2013 Smalley began hosting early morning radio programme Early Edition on Newstalk ZB, airing weekdays 5am-6am. In 2014 Smalley joined TVNZ's Q + A team on TV One.

On 13 October 2017, Smalley announced her departure from Newstalk ZB and her 20-year journalism career. Her final Early Edition show was broadcast on 15 December 2017.

See also
 List of New Zealand television personalities

References

External links

NZ Women's Weekly article: Rachel Smalley: ‘Why I’ll never be a supermum’
Rachel Smalley's "Candid" Interview on Throng
KPMG Early Edition show page on Newstalk ZB website
Rachel Smalley's LinkedIn Page
Rachel Smalley reports on the Syrian refugee crisis for World Vision

New Zealand television presenters
New Zealand women television presenters
Living people
Newstalk ZB
People educated at Lincoln High School, New Zealand
Year of birth missing (living people)